Joachim von zur Gathen (born 1950) is a German and computer scientist. His research spans several areas in mathematics and computer science, including computational complexity, cryptography, finite fields, and computer algebra.

Biography
Joachim von zur Gathen has a Diploma in Mathematik from ETH Zürich, and graduated as Dr. phil. from Universität Zürich in 1980 under the supervision of Volker Strassen. The title of his Ph.D. thesis is "Sekantenräume von Kurven". In 1981 he accepted a position in the Department of Computer Science at the University of Toronto, eventually becoming a Full Professor. In 1994, he moved to the Department of Mathematics at Universität Paderborn. Since 2004, he has been a professor at the B-IT and the Department of Computer Science at the Universität Bonn. He is the founding editor-in-chief of the Birkhäuser (now Springer) journal Computational Complexity.

A symposium at B-IT in 2010 was held in honor of his 60th birthday, and a special issue of the Journal of Symbolic Computation was published as a festschrift for the event.

Selected publications
  Translated into Japanese. Chinese edition.

References

External links
 Homepage at the b-it

1950 births
Living people
20th-century German mathematicians
German computer scientists
Theoretical computer scientists
21st-century German mathematicians